Simon Aspelin and Johan Landsberg were the defending champions but did not compete that year.

Julien Boutter and Fabrice Santoro won in the final 7–6(9–7), 7–5 against Michael Hill and Jeff Tarango.

Seeds

  Max Mirnyi /  Nenad Zimonjić (semifinals)
  Justin Gimelstob /  Scott Humphries (first round)
  David Adams /  Marius Barnard (first round)
  Michael Hill /  Jeff Tarango (final)

Draw

External links
Main Draw on ATP Archive

Open 13
2001 ATP Tour